The Office of Public Works (OPW), together with the National Parks and Wildlife Service of the Department of Tourism, Culture, Arts, Gaeltacht, Sport and Media are responsible for the a number of heritage sites of Ireland. They undertake protection and conservation of Ireland's heritage (specifically buildings and historic sites).

The following is a list of Government owned heritage sites in Ireland.

A-C 
 Adare Castle – Adare County Limerick – A medieval fortified castle that was an important stronghold of the Earl of Desmond.
 Altamount Gardens – Tullow, County Carlow – Old world garden, Robinsonian in style.
 Ardfert Cathedral – Ardfert, County Kerry – 12th to 17th century Cathedral.
 Athenry Castle – Athenry, County Galway – 13th century, 3-storey tower house
 Aughnanure Castle – Oughterard, County Galway – 16th-century tower house.
 Ballyhack Castle – Ballyhack, County Wexford – 15th-century tower house built by the Knights Hospitallers of St. John
 Barryscourt Castle – Carrigtwohill, County Cork – 15th to 16th century Castle.
 Blasket Center – Dunchaoin, County Kerry – interpretation center for native language, culture and tradition of Blasket Islanders.
 Boyle Abbey – Boyle, County Roscommon – 12th century Cistercian Monastery.
 Brú na Bóinne – Donore, County Meath Neolithic monuments and interpretative centre.
 Cahir Castle – Cahir, County Tipperary
 Carrowmore Megalithic Cemetery – County Sligo Neolithic monuments and interpretative centre.
 Céide Fields – County Mayo - Neolithic field system
 Connemara National Park – County Galway – 20 square kilometre park surrounding the Twelve Bens mountains.
 Coole Park Visitor Centre – Gort, County Galway, Nature reserve, former home of Lady Gregory, one of the founders of the Abbey Theatre
 Corlea Trackway Visitor Centre – Kenagh, County Longford – an Iron Age bog road, dating from 148BC.

D-K 

 Derrynane House – Caherdaniel, County Kerry – Ancestral home of Daniel O'Connell.
 Desmond Castle – Kinsale, County Cork – a 16th-century Custom house.
 Desmond Hall – Newcastlewest, County Limerick a 15th-century Castle.
 Donegal Castle – Donegal, County Donegal – a 15th-century Norman tower house with the addition of a 17th-century Jacobean Manor House.
 Doneraile Park – Doneraile, County Cork – an 18th-century landscaped park.
 Dromore Wood – Ennis, County Clare – Nature reserve.
 Dun Aonghasa – Inishmore, Aran Islands, County Galway – A prehistoric stone fort.
 Dungarvan Castle – Dungarvan, County Waterford, Castle with a 12th-century shell keep, with curtain wall, corner tower and gate tower.
 Dunmore Caves – Ballyfoyle, County Kilkenny – limestone cave, site of Viking massacre in 928.
 Dwyer McAllister Cottage – Derrynamuck, County Wicklow – a traditional whitewashed cottage historically linked with the 1798 Rebellion.
 Emo Court – Emo, County Laois – a neo-classical house with extensive parklands
 Ennis Friary – Ennis, County Clare – 13th-century Franciscan Friary.
 Famine Warhouse 1848 – Ballingarry, County Tipperary – site of a skirmish in the Young Irelander Rebellion of 1848
 Ferns Castle – Ferns, County Wexford – 13th-century castle featuring circular chapel, original fireplaces and a vaulted basement.
 Fota Gardens – Fota Island, Carrigtwohill, County Cork – 110,000 square metre park with ornamental pond and Italian walled gardens.
 Gallarus Castle – Ballydavid, County Kerry – a pre 1600 castle on the Dingle Peninsula built by the Knight of Kerry.
 Garnish Island – Bantry, County Cork – Island garden sheltered in Glengarriff harbour.
 Glebe House and Gallery – Churchill, Letterkenny, County Donegal – Regency House.
 Glendalough – Glendalough, County Wicklow – monastic site founded in 6th century, site has a Round Tower, stone churches and multiple stone crosses.
 Glenveagh National Park – Churchill, Letterkenny, County Donegal – 170 square kilometres of mountains, woodland and lakes.
 Heywood Gardens – Ballinakill, County Laois – Formal garden designed by Sir Edwin Lutyens
 Hill of Tara – Navan, County Meath – Seat of the High Kings of Ireland, Pre-Christian center of political and religious power.
 Holy Cross Abbey - Holycross, County Tipperary - 12th century abbey
 Jerpoint Abbey – Thomastown, County Kilkenny – Cistercian monastery.
 John F. Kennedy Arboretum – New Ross, County Wexford – 2.52 square kilometre arboretum dedicated to US President John F. Kennedy.
 Kells Priory - Kells, County Kilkenny
 Kilkenny Castle – Kilkenny, County Kilkenny – castle with extensive parklands.
 Killarney National Park – Killarney, County Kerry – 103 square kilometres of mountains, woodlands including the Lakes of Killarney.
 Kilmacurrage Arboretum – Rathdrum, County Wicklow

L-Q 

 Listowel Castle – Listowel, County Kerry – 13th century Castle.
 The Main Guard - Carrick-on-Suir, County Tipperary
 Maynooth Castle – Maynooth, County Kildare – 13th-century Castle.
 Muckross House – Killarney, County Kerry – Victorian House and Cardens located in Killarney National Park.
 Muckross Friary – Killarney, County Kerry – 15th century Franciscan friary.
 Newmills Corn and Flax Mills – Letterkenny, County Donegal – restored industrial buildings powered by watermill on the River Swilly.
 O'Dea Castle – County Clare – a 15th-century castle with high cross and visitor's centre
 Oldbridge Estate – site of Battle of the Boyne
 Old Mellifont Abbey – Tullyallen, Drogheda, County Louth – Ireland's first Cistercian abbey.
 Ormonde Castle – Carrick-on-Suir, County Tipperary – 1560s Elizabethan manor house
 Patrick Pearse's Cottage – County Galway
 Parke's Castle – County Leitrim
 Portumna Castle – Portumna, County Galway

R-Z 

 Rathfarnham Castle – Rathfarnham, County Dublin
 Reginald's Tower – Waterford, County Waterford
 Rock of Cashel – Cashel, County Tipperary – traditional seat of the Kings of Munster
 Roscrea Castle – Roscrea, County Tipperary
 Ross Castle – Killarney, County Kerry
 St. Mary's Church – Gowran, County Kilkenny
 Scattery Island Cathedral and Monastery – County Clare – early Christian place of pilgrimage
 Sligo Abbey – Sligo, County Sligo
 Swiss Cottage – Cahir, County Tipperary
 Tintern Abbey – County Wexford – Cistercian abbey
 Trim Castle – Trim, County Meath – Norman castle
 Wexford Wildfowl Reserve - North Slob, County Wexford

External reference 
Heritage Sites of Ireland, Pamphlet, OPW.

External links 
Heritage Ireland

Heritage sites
Tourism in the Republic of Ireland
History of the Republic of Ireland
Heritage registers in the Republic of Ireland
Cultural heritage of Ireland
History organisations based in the Republic of Ireland